Roxanne Persaud (born March 1, 1966) is a Guyanese-American politician. She is a Democrat and a member of the New York Senate for the 19th district, which includes portions of Canarsie, East New York, Brownsville, Mill Basin, Sheepshead Bay, Bergen Beach, Marine Park, Flatlands, Ocean Hill and Starrett City in Brooklyn.

Life and career
A native of Guyana, Persaud immigrated with her family to Brooklyn, New York as a young person. She is of Dougla (Indo-Guyanese and Afro-Guyanese) heritage. She graduated from Pace University with both a Bachelor of Science and Master of Science in Education Administration before entering a career in education.

Persaud previously served as a school administrator with Pace University and St. Francis College, Brooklyn, and also was involved with her community board in Canarsie, and has served on numerous boards and commissions for the community. In 2015, Persaud won the Democratic nomination to succeed Alan Maisel in the New York Assembly, and served from January to November 2015.

New York Senate
In 2015, Senator John Sampson was found guilty of corruption and forced to resign. Persaud, then a first-term Assemblywoman, was chosen by the Kings County Democratic Party to succeed him, and easily won election that November to finish his term. In 2016, Persaud faced a primary challenge from Mercedes Narcisse, who was backed by Assemblyman Charles Barron and Councilwoman Inez Barron. Persaud easily defeated Narcisse with over 75% of the vote. Persaud easily won re-election in 2016, 2018, and 2020.

Persaud was sworn in as state Senator on November 4, 2015. In 2019, with Democrats gaining the majority in the Senate, Persaud was named Chair of the Social Services Committee.

References

External links
Senator Roxanne Persaud official site

Living people
People from Brooklyn
Democratic Party New York (state) state senators
Women state legislators in New York (state)
Pace University alumni
21st-century American politicians
American politicians of Indian descent
Guyanese emigrants to the United States
21st-century American women politicians
Asian-American people in New York (state) politics
1966 births